Janapav also known as Janapav Kuti is a mountain at altitude of 854m from sea level & highest peak of vindhayanchal range. a famous tourist place located on Indore-Mumbai highway, near the village of Janapav Kuti in Mhow Tehsil, Indore district of  Madhya Pradesh. It is 45 kilometers from Indore. The mountain is surrounded by dense forests. The place is quite popular among trekkers for its scenic beauty and adventurous routes. The place is also famous for being the birthplace of Lord Parshurama and the fair that is held here every year on Kartik Purnima which is the first full moon after Diwali.

Historical importance

As per the legend, it is the birthplace of Lord Parshurama, the sixth avatar of Lord Vishnu, and is considered sacred by the Hindu community. At the top of the hill, there is an ashram of Jamadagni, the father of Parashurama. His mother Renuka was a renowned medical practitioner and had then grown a variety of herbs on the hill and its surroundings. As per some reports, even today, many Ayurvedic doctors from across the country arrive at the hill in search of herbs.

As per the folklore, twelve rivers originate from the tank situated on this hill, including Chambal, Saraswati & Nakheri.

Development
As many devotees visit the temple every year, a road was constructed from highway to the top of the mountain to facilitate easy transport. In May 2008, the government of Madhya Pradesh announced to develop the site into an international pilgrimage centre. The development package was sanctioned for the construction of road, electrification, arrangement of drinking water, renovation of the pond, construction of a temple, ambulatory path, museum, and a research seat.

Travel and accommodation

The place is well connected and transport is available to visit Janapav from Indore and Mhow. Popular for its scenic beauty, Janapav is also a popular trekking and cycling destination. Good connectivity with Indore helps in keeping a great influx of tourists.

References

Tourist attractions in Indore district
Hindu pilgrimage sites in India
Mhow